A nephanalaysis is the analysis of a synoptic chart focusing on the types and amount of clouds and precipitation.  A nephanalysis can be used to avoid hazardous weather areas, by ships preparing routes for cruises, and to locate good fishing areas.  This technique is rarely performed in modern forecasting, due to the prevalence of worldwide satellite imagery.

References

Synoptic meteorology and weather